Milton Campbell (born May 15, 1976) is a former track and field athlete from the United States who mainly competes in the 400 metres.

His success comes during the indoor season. At the 1999 IAAF World Indoor Championships he set a world record of 3:02.83m over 4 x 400 metres relay together with Andre Morris, Dameon Johnson and Deon Minor.

Campbell won the American Indoor Championships over 400 metres in 2004 and 2006.

Campbell is originally from Atlanta, Georgia.  He was a junior state, regional, and national champion runner with Quicksilver Track Club from Atlanta.  In junior track, Campbell was as dominant in the 1500 meters as he was in the 800 and 400 meters.

Campbell was a state champion in the 400 and 800 meters for Douglass High School of northwest Atlanta in Georgia's then-largest division, 4A.

Personal bests
 200 metres – 20.47 (2002)-Atlanta USA
 400 metres – 44.67 (1997)-Stuttgart Germany
 800 metres – 1:50.96 (2004)-Atlanta USA
 4 x 400 meters relay-3:02.83 (1999)- Maeboshi Japan

Achievements

References

External links
 
 

1976 births
Living people
American male sprinters
World Athletics Indoor Championships winners
World Athletics Indoor Championships medalists